Chester L. Schmitt (May 8, 1912 – February 20, 1993) of New Kensington, Pennsylvania served in the State Legislature for 16 years, serving the 54th District. He is noted for working to establish the PA Consumer Credit Act, which served as the model for the Federal Truth In Lending Law. Mr. Schmitt was known to his constituents as "Mr. Consumer." A bridge which was built in 1927, connecting New Kensington to East Deer Township, PA, across the Allegheny River, was named in his honor in 1989.

Before and after his time in office, Mr. Schmitt owned a successful insurance and real estate company in New Kensington, which he opened in 1945.

Mr. Schmitt was also the President of The International Brotherhood of Magicians during the 1961-1962 membership year. As of 2008, the IBM has had only 69 International Presidents since being founded in 1922. Per that organization's house organ, The Linking Ring (Vol. 41, No. 5), his jobs previous to his time in office (and his later business interests) included being a newsboy, bowling alley pin-boy (and later, the alley's manager), movie projectionist and grocery chain store manager.

He died of complications from Parkinson's disease in 1993. His wife was Sally Lou Schmitt, who was also licensed in insurance and real estate sales and co-ran their business.  Together they had four children: Patty Lou Martini, Jim Schmitt, Susan Reed and David Schmitt.  All were involved in magic at one time of their lives. C.L. and Sally Lou had a total of 8 Grandchildren.

References

Democratic Party members of the Pennsylvania House of Representatives
1912 births
1993 deaths
Neurological disease deaths in Pennsylvania
Deaths from Parkinson's disease
20th-century American politicians